The 2015–16 Seattle Redhawks women's basketball team represented Seattle University during the 2015–16 NCAA Division I women's basketball season. The Redhawks, led by seventh year head coach Joan Bonvicini, played their home games at the Connolly Center and were a members of the Western Athletic Conference. They finished the season 9–21, 3–11 in WAC play to finish in eighth place. They lost in the quarterfinals of the WAC women's tournament to Cal State Bakersfield.

Roster

Schedule

|-
!colspan=9 style="background:#BA0C2F; color:#FFFFFF;"| Non-conference regular season

|-
!colspan=9 style="background:#BA0C2F; color:#FFFFFF;"| WAC regular season

|-
!colspan=9 style="background:#BA0C2F; color:#FFFFFF;"| WAC Women's Tournament

Source

See also
 2015–16 Seattle Redhawks men's basketball team

References

Seattle Redhawks women's basketball seasons
Seattle
Seattle Redhawks
Seattle Redhawks
Seattle Redhawks